David Quammen (born February 24, 1948) is an American science, nature, and travel writer and the author of fifteen books. His articles have appeared in Outside Magazine, National Geographic, Harper's, Rolling Stone, The New York Times Book Review, The New Yorker, and other periodicals. 

A collection of David Quammen's drafts, research, and correspondence is housed in Texas Tech University’s Southwest Collection/Special Collections Library. The collection consists of approximately 63 boxes of publicly available literary production, artifacts, maps, and other papers dated between 1856-2014.

Early life and education 
David Quammen was born on February 24, 1948 to W.A. and Mary Quammen. He was raised in the suburbs of Cincinnati, Ohio, and graduated from St. Xavier High School in 1966. Following this, he was awarded the Rhodes Scholarship, aiding him in attending and graduating from Yale. During his graduate studies at Oxford, he studied literature, concentrating on the works of William Faulkner. After the completion of his education and the publication of his first novel, he relocated to Bozeman, Montana, where he currently lives with his wife, Betsy Gaines Quammen.

Career 
In the early 1970s, Quammen moved to Montana for trout fishing. In 1983, he finished The Soul of Viktor Tronko, a spy novel based on Russian historical events. A year later, Blood Line: Stories of Fathers and Sons was published. Following the failure of his spy novel, Quammen began transitioning into a nonfiction writer.

In 1981, Quammen began writing columns for Outside Magazine, and continued for fifteen years. Some of the columns from Outside Magazine and others contributed to Quammen's nonfiction books: Natural Acts (1985), The Flight of the Iguana (1988), Wild Thoughts from Wild Places (1998), and The Boilerplate Rhino (2000).

Later in 1999, Quammen began to write a series of three stories following J. Michael Fay's 2000-mile hike through Central Africa for National Geographic. During this time, Quammen walked with Fay for eight weeks along African river basins. Quammen continued working with National Geographic, holding a Contributing Writer position, producing cover stories like "Was Darwin Wrong?" and "The Short Happy Life of a Serengeti Lion."

From 2007 to 2009, Quammen was employed as the Wallace Stegner Professor of Western American Studies at Montana State University. Quammen received honorary doctorates from Montana State University and Colorado College. For his work, Quammen was awarded with a Rhodes Scholarship, a Guggenheim Fellowship, and a Lannan Literary Award for nonfiction.

His book Spillover: Animal Infections and the Next Human Pandemic  (2012) received two awards: the Science and Society Book Award, given by the National Association of Science Writers, and the Society of Biology (UK) Book Award in General Biology. In 2013, Spillover was shortlisted for the PEN/E. O. Wilson Literary Science Writing Award. The Song of the Dodo (Scribner, 1996), a study of the bird's extinction won the John Burroughs Medal for nature writing.

Books

Non-fiction
 Quammen, David. Natural Acts: a Sidelong View of Science and Nature. New York: Schocken Books, 1985.
 Quammen, David. The Flight of the Iguana: a Sidelong View of Science and Nature. New York: Delacorte Press, 1988.
 Quammen, David. "Miracle of the Geese." Words from the Land: Encounters with Natural History Writing. Salt Lake City: Peregrine Smith Books, 1988.
 Quammen, David. The Song of the Dodo: Island Biogeography in an Age of Extinctions. New York: Scribner, 1996.
 Quammen, David. Wild Thoughts From Wild Places. New York: Scribner, 1999.
 Quammen, David, ed. Best American Science and Nature Writing. Boston: Mariner Books, 2000.
 Quammen, David. The Boilerplate Rhino: Nature in the Eye of the Beholder. New York: Scribner, 2001.
 Quammen, David. Monster of God: The Man-Eating Predator in the Jungles of History and the Mind. New York, W. W. Norton, 2003.
 Quammen, David. Alexis Rockman. New York: Monacelli Press, 2004.
 Quammen, David. The Reluctant Mr. Darwin: An Intimate Portrait of Charles Darwin and the Making of His Theory of Evolution. New York: W. W. Norton, 2006.
 Quammen, David. The Kiwi's Egg: Charles Darwin and Natural Selection. London: Weidenfeld & Nicolson, 2007.
 Quammen, David. Spillover: Animal Infections and the Next Human Pandemic. New York: Norton, 2012. 
 Quammen, David. Ebola: The Natural and Human History of a Deadly Virus. New York: Norton, 2014.
 Quammen, David. The Chimp and the River: How AIDS emerged from an African Forest. New York: Norton, 2015.
 Quammen, David. Yellowstone: A Journey Through America’s Wild Heart. National Geographic, 2016.
 Quammen, David. The Tangled Tree: A Radical New History of Life. New York: Simon & Schuster, 2019.
 Quammen, David. Breathless: The Scientific Race to Defeat a Deadly Virus. New York: Simon & Schuster, 2022.

Fiction
Quammen, David. Walking Out, 1980.
Quammen, David. The Zolta Configuration. New York: Doubleday Books, 1983.
Quammen, David. To Walk the Line. New York: Pocket Books, 1985.
Quammen, David. The Soul of Viktor Tronko. New York: Dell,1987.
Quammen, David. Blood Line: Stories of Father and Sons. Boulder: Johnson Books, 1988.

Awards and accolades

1970 Rhodes Scholarship
1987 National Magazine Award
1988 Guggenheim Fellowship
1994 National Magazine Award
1996 Academy Award in Literature from the American Academy of Arts and Letters
1996 Natural World Book Prize
1997 Helen Bernstein Book Award for Excellence in Journalism
1997 Lannan Foundation Fellowship
1997 John Burroughs Medal for nature writing
2000 Honorary doctorate from Montana State University 
2001 PEN/Spielvogel-Diamonstein Award for the Art of the Essay for The Boilerplate Rhino
2005 National Magazine Award
2009 Honorary doctorate from Colorado College
2012 The Stephen Jay Gould Prize from the Society for the Study of Evolution
2013 Andrew Carnegie Medal for Excellence in Nonfiction, finalist for Spillover

See also
 Edward Abbey

References

External links

 Author papers at Southwest Collection/Special Collections Library, Texas Tech University
 Video: David Quammen discussing Spillover, September 2012
 From the NPR Radio Show, Krulwich on Science, titled "Three Nice Things We Can Say About Mosquitoes", July 30, 2008
 From the NPR Radio Show the Bryant Park Project interview about his book "The Reluctant Mr. Darwin" on July 1, 2008
 From the NPR Radio Show, Krulwich on Science, titled "The Racing Asparagus" (promoting his Charles Darwin biography), September 20, 2006
 Books by David Quammen
 "Walking Out" (1980) - full text at the Short Story Project

American nature writers
American non-fiction environmental writers
American science writers
American science journalists
20th-century American novelists
20th-century American non-fiction writers
21st-century American non-fiction writers
National Geographic people
Charles Darwin biographers
American Rhodes Scholars
John Burroughs Medal recipients
PEN/Diamonstein-Spielvogel Award winners
St. Xavier High School (Ohio) alumni
Yale University alumni
Alumni of Merton College, Oxford
Writers from Cincinnati
Writers from Montana
American male writers
People from Bozeman, Montana
1948 births
Living people